Veon may refer to:

 Mike Veon, United States politician
 VEON, telecommunications company